Stewart County is the name of two counties in the United States of America:
Stewart County, Georgia
Stewart County, Tennessee